Hillhead is a hamlet in the parish of Lostwithiel, Cornwall, England.

References

Hamlets in Cornwall
Lostwithiel